Orchomenus or Orchomenos or Orkhomenos may refer to:

Greek mythology
Orchomenus (mythology), the name of several distinct figures

Ancient Greek geography

 Orchomenus (Arcadia), also called the Arcadian Orchomenus, a city of Arcadia
 Orchomenus (Boeotia), also called the Minyean Orchomenus, a city of Boeotia
 Orchomenus (Euboea), a town of ancient Euboea
 Orchomenus (Thessaly), a town of ancient Thessaly

History
 Battle of Orchomenus, fought in 85 BCE near the Minyean Orchomenus